Final table of the 1990-1991 season of the French Championship of Rugby League.

Final table

Final 

{| align="left" cellpadding="4" cellspacing="0"  style="margin: 0 0 0 0; border: 1px solid #999; border-right-width: 2px; border-bottom-width: 2px; background-color: #DDDDDD"
|-
| width="150" valign="top" |Teams
| width="500" bgcolor=#EEEEEE| Saint-Gaudens  - Villeneuve-sur-Lot
|-
| valign="top" | Score
| bgcolor=#EEEEEE| 10-8
|-
| valign="top" | Date
| bgcolor=#EEEEEE| 26 May 1991
|-
| valign="top" | Venue
| bgcolor=#EEEEEE| Stadium Municipal, Toulouse
|-
| valign="top" |Referee
| bgcolor=#EEEEEE| Claude Alba
|-
| valign="top" | Line-up
| bgcolor=#EEEEEE|
|-
| valign="top" |  Saint-Gaudens 
| bgcolor=#EEEEEE |John Maguire, Cyril Pons, Philippe Fourquet, Gilles Dumas (C), Chris Hastings,  Robert Viscay, Théo Anast, Yves Storer, Gérard Boyals, Richard Clarke, Denis Bienès, Claude Sirvent, Yves Allègre Replacements : Patrick Cowel, Peter Martin, Nassim Kebdani, Lionel Garrigues Coach: Pierre Surre
|-
| valign="top" | Villeneuve-sur-Lot 
| bgcolor=#EEEEEE |Daniel Calvet, Patrice Campana, Michel Balette, David Despin, Mark Wakefield, Christophe Delbert, Small, Antoine Lopes, Jean-Luc Rabot (C), Bernard Planté, Daniel Verdès, Jean-Bernard Saumitou, Thierry Matter Replacements :  Hurst, Bayssieres, Monbet, Vareille Player-Coach: Mark Wakefield
|-
| valign="top" | Scorers
| bgcolor=#EEEEEE|
|-
| valign="top" |  Saint-Gaudens 
| bgcolor=#EEEEEE| 1 try Clarke, 1 conversion Hastings, 2 penalties Hastings
|-
| valign="top" | Saint-Estève
| bgcolor=#EEEEEE| 1 try Campana, 1 conversion Balette, 1 penalty Balette

References

External links
 1990-1991 ranking

Rugby league competitions in France
French Championship season
French Championship season